China National Highway 215 (G215) (sometimes referred to as Gansu Provincial Highway 215) runs from Hongliuyuan, Gansu to Yushu, Qinghai. It was originally 641 kilometres in length and ran south from Hongliuyuan towards Golmud. As part of the 2013 National Highway extension plan, it was extended to Yushu via Qumarlêb County and Zhidoi County, superseding part of Qinghai provincial highway S308.

Route and distance

See also
 China National Highways

References

External links
Official website of Ministry of Transport of PRC

215
Transport in Qinghai
Transport in Gansu